Ka or KA may refer to:

Arts and entertainment
 K.A. (Kohntarkosz Anteria), a 2004 album by Magma
 Kà, a Cirque du Soleil show
 Ka (Dark Tower), a plot element in Stephen King's Dark Tower series
 Mister Mosquito, a 2001 video game, known in Japan as Ka

Businesses and organizations
 Kappa Alpha Order, a fraternity founded in 1865 at Washington and Lee
 Kappa Alpha Society, a fraternity founded in 1825 at Union College
 Karenni Army, a Burmese guerilla organization
 Knattspyrnufélag Akureyrar, an Icelandic football club
 Kuklos Adelphon, an 1800s-era Southern fraternity
 Khan Academy, a non-profit educational organization
 King's Arms, Oxford, a pub known as the KA

Language

Languages
 Ka, a variety of the Central Banda language
 Georgian language, by ISO 639-1 code

Characters
 Ka (Cyrillic), a letter in Russian and other eastern european languages
 Ka (Indic), a group of related glyphs from the Brahmic family of scripts
 Devanagari ka, a letter in the Devanagari script
 Ka (Javanese) (ꦏ), a letter in the Javanese script
 Ka (kana), a syllabic grapheme in the Japanese katakana and hiragana scripts

People
 Ka (pharaoh) (fl. c. thirty-second century B.C.), Predynastic pharaoh of Upper Egypt
 Ka (rapper) (born 1972), performer

Places
 Ka Farm, Østre Toten, Norway; see List of short place names
 Ka Island (Ka-to), North Korea
 KA postcode area, Scotland
 Ka River, Nigeria
 Karlsruhe, Germany (e.g. code used on German vehicle registration plates)
 Karnataka, India

Science and technology
 Ka, an acid dissociation constant
 Ka band, a microwave band
 Ka, the absorption rate constant of a drug
 Ka, number of non-synonymous substitutions at a DNA site, used in Ka/Ks ratio
 Ka tree, Terminalia carolinensis
 ka, thousand years, kyr
 Keepalive, a computer network message
 Kiloampere (kA), a unit of electric current
 kiloannus or kiloannum (ka), a unit of time equal to one thousand (103) years

Transport
 Ford Ka, a car
 NZR KA class, a New Zealand steam locomotive
 Cathay Dragon (IATA code KA), formerly Dragonair
 Kenya Airways
 Code for products of Kamov, a Russian rotorcraft manufacturing company

Other uses 
 Ka (Bengali), a consonant character
 Ka (cuneiform)
 Ka or kꜣ, "double" or "vital essence", an Ancient Egyptian concept of the soul or spirit
 Knight or Dame of St Andrew, a Barbadian award
 Kingda Ka, a roller coaster at Six Flags Great Adventure
 KA, a carbonated drink produced by the company A.G. Barr
 KA, law enforcement jargon for "known associate"